Olga Ivanovna Melnik (born 12 May 1974 in Sovetsky, Khanty-Mansi Autonomous Okrug) is a Russian biathlete. At the 1998 Winter Olympics in Nagano, she received a silver medal with the Russian relay team, which consisted of herself, Galina Koukleva, Albina Akhatova and Olga Romasko.

References

1974 births
Living people
People from Khanty-Mansi Autonomous Okrug
Russian female biathletes
Olympic biathletes of Russia
Biathletes at the 1998 Winter Olympics
Olympic silver medalists for Russia
Olympic medalists in biathlon
Biathlon World Championships medalists
Medalists at the 1998 Winter Olympics
Sportspeople from Khanty-Mansi Autonomous Okrug
20th-century Russian women
21st-century Russian women